Silveira is a parish (freguesia) in the municipality of Torres Vedras in Portugal. The population in 2011 was 8,530, in an area of 24.97 km².
It is bordered by the parishes of São Pedro da Cadeira to the south, Ponte do Rol to the east, A dos Cunhados e Maceira to the north, and the Atlantic Ocean to the west.

References

Freguesias of Torres Vedras